Apioplagiostoma is a genus of fungi within the family Valsaceae.

References

External links
Apioplagiostoma at Index Fungorum

Diaporthales